Outer Coast College is a small, private, liberal arts college in development in Sitka, Alaska. It is currently in the accreditation process with the goal of expansion into a two-year undergraduate program.

History 
After Sheldon Jackson College closed in 2007, the title to the campus was transferred to the Sitka Fine Arts Camp in February 2011. In the summer of 2014, Alaska state representative Jonathan Kreiss-Tomkins began deliberating with alumni, teachers and students of Deep Springs College about the possibility of founding a new college on the historic campus in partnership with the Fine Arts Camp. Full-time work to create Outer Coast began in September 2015.

In October 2017, the Outer Coast team committed to launching the Outer Coast Summer Seminar in the summer of 2018. The inaugural seminar was held from July to August, drawing in rising high school junior and seniors from Alaska and the continental United States to participate in rigorous college-level courses as well as numerous service projects. The 2019 Summer Seminar was held the following summer, and the 2020 summer seminar is currently in planning stages. In July 2020, the summer seminar included an online class in the Tlingit language. 

Additionally, an "Outer Coast Year" for high school graduates is being planned for the 2020–21 academic year.

Philosophy 
Outer Coast is modeled on Deep Springs College and its "three pillars" of academics, labor and self-governance. However, it differentiates in that labor is service-oriented in partnership with the community of Sitka and that it was founded as a co-educational institution. In the 2018 Summer Seminar, self-governance was exercised by students having autonomy over rules and regulations, as decided during student body meetings adhering to Robert's Rules of Order. Outer Coast places a strong emphasis on the incorporation of Tlingit and other Native Alaskan perspectives in both the selection of its student body and curriculum.

References 

2015 establishments in Alaska
Educational institutions established in 2015
Liberal arts colleges in Alaska
Private universities and colleges in Alaska
Sitka, Alaska